Benson is an unincorporated community in the Canadian province of Saskatchewan. It is located between Estevan and Stoughton on Highway 47. Currently it has a curling rink, community hall and the municipal offices of Rural Municipality of Benson No. 35. The geographical location for Benson is north of the Canada–US border and North Dakota.

On July 1, 1935, Benson was hit by a tornado, killing 1, injuring 2, and levelling multiple structures.

Demographics 

Gallery

References

External links 

Benson No. 35, Saskatchewan
Designated places in Saskatchewan
Former villages in Saskatchewan
Unincorporated communities in Saskatchewan
Populated places disestablished in 2003
Division No. 1, Saskatchewan